Saint-Maurice-la-Souterraine is a commune in the Creuse department in central France.

Geography
The river Semme flows west through the commune's southern part.

The river Brame flows west through the commune's northern part.

Population

See also
Communes of the Creuse department

References

Communes of Creuse